Disney's Children's Favorite Songs, Volume 4 is a collection of 27 classic children's songs performed by Larry Groce and The Disneyland Children's Sing-Along Chorus. The Choral Director is Dawn Halloran. The CD was produced by Ted Kryczko and Pat Patrick; engineered by Kent Madison and George Charouhas, and distributed by Buena Vista Pictures Distribution Inc. in 1990.

Track listing
All songs are public domain except where listed.
"Oh Where, Oh Where Has My Little Dog Gone?" (Septimus Winner)
"The Wheels on the Bus" (Verna Hills)
"Do Your Ears Hang Low?"
"Dem Bones" (James Weldon Johnson and J. Rosamond Johnson)
"The Wabash Cannonball"
"Brother, Come and Dance with Me" (Engelbert Humperdinck)
"Frog Went a-Courting"
"Big Rock Candy Mountain"
"Kookaburra"
"You Are My Sunshine" (Jimmie Davis and Charles Mitchell)
"Funiculi, Funicula" (Luigi Denza and Peppino Turco; English lyrics by Edward Oxenford)
"Old Dan Tucker"
"It's a Small World" (Richard M. Sherman and Robert B. Sherman)
"Camping" (from the Disneyland/Golden Book Read-Along Save the Day) (Larry Groce)
"There's a Hole in My Bucket"
"Cockles and Mussels"
"I'm a Little Teapot" (George Harry Sanders and Clarence Kelley)
"Comin' Through the Rye"
"Git Along, Little Dogies"
"Reuben and Rachel" (William Gooch and Harry Birch)
"He's Got the Whole World in His Hands"
Nursery Rhyme Medley: "Hickory Dickory Dock", "Jack and Jill", "Jack Be Nimble"
"Down by the Station"
"Meet Me In St. Louis" (Kerry Mills and Andrew B. Sterling)
"The Marvelous Toy" (Tom Paxton)
"Go In and Out the Window" (Lew Pollack)
"Mickey Mouse March" (Jimmie Dodd)

References 

1990 compilation albums
Disneyland Records compilation albums
Children's music albums